XHZZZ-FM is a radio station in Manzanillo, Colima. It is owned by RadioLevy and is operated by Grupo Audiorama with its La Bestia Grupera grupera format.

History
XHANZ-FM received its concession on October 21, 1994, though it changed its callsign to XHZZZ-FM before 2000.

On June 21, 2019, RadioLevy announced that Grupo Radiorama would take over operation of its three radio stations on July 1, 2019. New Audiorama formats formally launched on the RadioLevy stations on July 15, with XHZZZ joining the La Bestia Grupera network.

References

Radio stations in Colima